The Paralyzed Veterans of America, a prominent veterans' service organization in the United States, was established in 1946 to serve the needs of disabled veterans. With 33 chapters and 70 National Service Offices across the US and Puerto Rico, the organization is headquartered in the nation's capital, Washington, D.C. In 1946, a group of service members who returned home from World War II with spinal cord injuries established the Paralyzed Veterans of America (PVA). The organization was created to allow its members, veterans of the armed forces living with spinal cord injuries or diseases like multiple sclerosis (MS) and amyotrophic lateral sclerosis (ALS), to live with independence, dignity, and as productive members of society. 

Today, PVA boasts a team of legislative advocates, architects, medical professionals, lawyers, and other highly trained professionals who work tirelessly to ensure that every veteran regains the freedom, independence, and quality of life they fought for. Serving as a major support system for our nation's paralyzed heroes, their families, and caregivers, PVA accomplishes its mission by ensuring quality healthcare, securing earned benefits, advocating for disability civil rights, making America more accessible, assisting veterans in finding meaningful careers, empowering them through sports, recreation, and wellness programs, and funding research and education to improve care and autonomy for individuals with paralysis.

PVA is a Congressionally-chartered organization under Title 36 of the United States Code. Its mission is to help paralyzed veterans and all people with disabilities live fuller, more productive lives.

Mission
PVA has developed a unique expertise on a wide variety of issues that affect veterans, specifically those with spinal cord injury or disease. PVA uses that expertise:

·        To advocate for and monitor the delivery of high quality and appropriate health care;

·        To assist in identifying and securing earned benefits available as a result of military service;

·        To promote research and education addressing spinal cord injury or disease;

·        To advocate for civil rights and opportunities that maximize independence of veterans and all people with disabilities.

PVA is unique in that it proudly serves as the lead voice on issues that impact not only veterans with disabilities, but all Americans.

Programs and services
The Paralyzed Veterans of America (PVA) is a comprehensive organization that provides integrative programs and services to severely disabled veterans, fulfilling all their needs. Its offerings include medical services and health policy, research and education, veterans benefits, government advocacy and legislation, architecture, Veterans Career Program, and sports and recreation.

Although PVA's programs and services primarily target veterans with spinal cord injuries and diseases, it extends its support to all able-bodied, ill, wounded, and injured veterans of all branches, conflicts, and eras, as well as to dependents, survivors, and caregivers in the global disability community. PVA provides all support free of charge to veterans and their families and operates without government funding, relying solely on the generosity of individual donors and corporate sponsors.

Veterans benefits

PVA offers assistance with VA claims and appeals to any veteran, family member, or caregiver – not just individuals who have sustained a spinal cord injury. 

Shortly after a veteran is injured, a PVA National Service Officer comes to their bedside to assist them with filing for VA benefits, so that the veteran can focus solely on their health and recovery. NSO’s are experts in veterans’ law and VA regulations, and know how to apply that knowledge to fight for the benefits a veteran has earned. This includes claims for service-connected compensation, non-service-connected pensions, home health care, specially adapted housing, automobile grants and adaptive equipment, and more.

Medical services and health policy

PVA’s medical services team strives to ensure the Department of Veterans Affairs is implementing best practices to improve quality of care in VA Spinal Cord Injury and Disorders Centers (SCI/D) across the country. During annual site visits to VA SCI/D and long-term care centers, PVA inspects facilities, confers with staff, ensures problems have been corrected, and speaks directly to patients about their needs. PVA’s site visit team is composed of physicians, nurses, staff, architects, and a field advisory committee who are paralyzed veterans themselves. 

PVA’s medical services department also operates a SCI/D hotline and develops consumer and clinical practice guidelines widely considered to set the standard of care.

Veterans Career Program

PVA’s Veterans Career Program provides career assistance and vocational counseling to transitioning service members, veterans, military spouses, and caregivers. The program operates through eight locations nationwide: Atlanta, Long Beach, Minneapolis, Philadelphia, Richmond, San Antonio, San Diego, and Washington, D.C. 

Clients receive one-on-one engagement on their path toward meaningful employment. Support is focused on the unique needs of each client, and can range from in-depth vocational rehabilitation, to developing a resume or practicing interviewing skills. The program has strong relationships with key employers, and PVA is able to provide needed support to these employers so they can successfully integrate Veterans into their organizations. 

PAVE staff work with any Veteran who needs help, but they specialize in those with barriers to employment, such as catastrophic injury or illness. This commitment was recognized by the U.S. Chamber of Commerce Foundation’s Hiring Our Heroes program, when PVA was a finalist for their Wounded Veteran and Military Caregiver Employment Award.

Veterans Career Live

Veterans Career Live is a virtual engagement initiative that reaches Veterans who do not have the time, means, or ability to attend traditional employment or educational events. 

With Veterans Career Live, veterans can: 

        Interact with PVA employment experts through virtual meetings.
        Access an online library of timely, relevant career information — on their schedule and from any device.
        View recorded presentations and other tools and resources on demand.
        Discover a wide range of meaningful education, volunteer, and employment opportunities.
        Meet companies and organizations eager to hire from the military and veteran community.

Architecture

PVA promotes state-of-the-art healing facilities for spinal cord injured veterans at VA hospitals, as well as barrier-free environments around the country for all people with disabilities. To accomplish this, PVA employs on-staff architects who work directly the VA and design teams. 

PVA is also a strong advocate for accessible design in the building and construction industries. PVA architects are frequently asked to consult on accessibility standards and building codes, and to work with cities and municipalities to improve access to facilities and transportation systems. They help advance accessible design through teaching, public speaking, seminars, and publications that deal with accessibility issues. 

Some of PVA’s notable achievements include advising on the accessibility of:

 Washington Nationals (Nationals Park) Ballpark
 Virginia Governor’s Executive Mansion
 Dwight D. Eisenhower Memorial
 Minnesota Vikings (U.S. Bank) Stadium
 REACH, a unique expansion of the John F. Kennedy Center for the Performing Arts

The Air Carrier Access Act of 1986 prohibits commercial airlines from discriminating against passengers with disabilities. The act was passed by the U.S. Congress in direct response to a narrow interpretation of Section 504 of the Rehabilitation Act of 1973 by the U.S. Supreme Court in U.S. Department of Transportation (DOT) v. Paralyzed Veterans of America (PVA) (1986). In this case, the Supreme Court held that private, commercial air carriers are not liable under Section 504 because they are not "direct recipients" of federal funding to airports.

Research and education

PVA supports research, educational programs, and other initiatives that unite people and activities toward a single mission: improved quality of life for everyone with spinal cord injury or disorders SCI/D, and diseases like MS and ALS.

The PVA Research Foundation funds scientists who conduct research to improve the lives of veterans and others living with SCI/D, as well as diseases like MS and ALS. These scientists address significant problems that impact our lives and develop new strategies to ameliorate them. Some strategies become clinical protocols and guide best practices, others are used to guide additional research efforts. All have the potential to be life changing for veterans and others living with SCI/D, their caregivers and health care partners.

Sports and recreation

From handcycling, bass fishing, bowling and billiards, to boccia, shooting sports, and an annual quad rugby tournament, PVA provides a wide variety of sports and recreation opportunities to enhance the fitness and quality of life for veterans with disabilities. It is often through participating in adaptive sports that many disabled veterans realize they can still live an active lifestyle in spite of their injuries.

Ratings
PVA received a Gold Star rating from GuideStar based on organizational mission, impact, financial data, and commitment to transparency in accordance with GAAP. PVA has also earned GuideStar's Platinum Seal of Transparency by voluntarily sharing the measures of progress and results they use to pursue their mission.  

In 2019, PVA was named one of the Top 5 Veterans Nonprofits by Impact Matters, a new charity rating system that measures the impact of contributions.

Presidents

 Gilbert Moss: 1947
 Richard Moss: 1948
 Bernard Shufelt: 1948–1949
 Patterson Grissom: 1950
 Stanley Reese: 1951
 William Green: 1952–1953
 Robert Frost: 1954–1955
 Raymond Conley: 1956–1957
 Harry A. Schweikert: 1958
 Dwight Guilfol: 1959
 Robert Classon: 1960–1961
 John Farkas: 1962–1963
 Harold Stone: 1964
 Harold W. Wagner: 1964–1965
 Leslie P. Burghoff: 1966–1967
 Wayne Capson: 1968–1969
 Carlos Rodriguez: 1970–1971
 Frank DeGeorge: 1972–1973
 Donald Broderick: 1974–1975
 Edward Jasper: 1976–1977
 Joseph Romagnano: 1978–1979
 Micheal Delaney: 1980–1981
 Paul Cheremeta: 1982–1983
 Richard Hoover: 1984–1986
 Jack Michaels: 1987–1988
 David Parker: 1989
 Victor McCoy: 1990–1991
 Richard Johnson: 1992–1993
 Richard Grant: 1994–1995
Kenneth Huber: 1996-1998
Homer Townsend, Jr.: 1999-2000
Joseph Fox, Sr.: 2001-2004
Randy Pleva, Sr.: 2005-2009
Gene Crayton: 2010
Bill Lawson: 2011-2014
Albert Kovach, Jr.: 2015-2017
David Zurfluh: 2017-2021
Charles Brown: 2021-

See also

American Theater (1939–1945)
Birmingham General Hospital, California
California during World War II
Ernest Bors
United States home front during World War II

References

 (source of past PVA presidents)

External links

 

Veterans' affairs in the United States
Organizations established in 1946
Patriotic and national organizations chartered by the United States Congress
Disability organizations based in the United States
American veterans' organizations